Fighting Mad may refer to:
 Fighting Mad (1976 film), a film directed by Jonathan Demme
 Fighting Mad (1917 film), an American silent western film
 Fighting Mad (1939 film), an American adventure film
 Fighting Mad (horse), an American Thoroughbred mare
 Joe Palooka in Fighting Mad, a 1948 American comedy film